Lobobunaea acetes is a species of moth in the family Saturniidae first described by John O. Westwood in 1849. It is found in Angola, Cameroon, the Democratic Republic of the Congo, Guinea, Kenya, Nigeria, Rwanda, Sierra Leone, Tanzania and Uganda.

Taxonomy
Lobobunaea leopoldi is treated as a valid species by some sources.

Gallery

References

Moths described in 1849
Saturniinae
Moths of Africa